Anton Samba (born April 5, 1982) is an Indonesian footballer that currently plays for PSMS Medan in the Indonesia Super League.

Club statistics

Hounors

Clubs
Persiwa Wamena :
Indonesia Super League runner-up : 1 (2008-09)

References

External links

1982 births
Association football midfielders
Living people
Indonesian footballers
Liga 1 (Indonesia) players
Persiwa Wamena players
PSMS Medan players
Indonesian Premier Division players
Persidafon Dafonsoro players
Persikabo Bogor players
Place of birth missing (living people)